Gary Keithley (born January 11, 1951) is a former professional American football quarterback and punter in the National Football League. Playing for the St. Louis Cardinals primarily as a backup to Jim Hart, he had a 0.0 passer rating in each of his first two career starts in 1973, the only quarterback in NFL history to do this in back-to-back games. Despite the dubious statistic, Keithley won in his first start against the Atlanta Falcons, a 32–10 victory in which he completed just two of ten passes for nine yards and an interception that was returned for a touchdown. The following year, Keithley lost his backup role to Dennis Shaw, who played for Cardinals head coach Don Coryell in college, while his punting duties were reassigned to rookie punter Hal Roberts. He then spent the off-season with the Seattle Seahawks before the 1976 NFL season but did not make the roster.

He was the backup quarterback of the BC Lions in 1977 and 1978.

References

1951 births
Living people
People from Alvin, Texas
Players of American football from Texas
American football quarterbacks
Canadian football quarterbacks
American players of Canadian football
UTEP Miners football players
St. Louis Cardinals (football) players
BC Lions players